The 1992 Oregon Ducks football team represented the University of Oregon during the 1992 NCAA Division I-A football season. They were led by head coach Rich Brooks, who was in his 16th season as head coach of the Ducks. They played their home games at Autzen Stadium in Eugene, Oregon and participated as members of the Pacific-10 Conference.

Schedule

Personnel

Season summary

Oregon State

References
 McCann, Michael C. (1995). Oregon Ducks Football: 100 Years of Glory. Eugene, Oregon: McCann Communications Corp. .

Oregon
Oregon Ducks football seasons
Oregon Ducks football